2 Chronicles 21 is the twenty-first chapter of the Second Book of Chronicles the Old Testament in the Christian Bible or of the second part of the Books of Chronicles in the Hebrew Bible. The book is compiled from older sources by an unknown person or group, designated by modern scholars as "the Chronicler", and had the final shape established in late fifth or fourth century BCE. This chapter belongs to the section focusing on the kingdom of Judah until its destruction by the Babylonians under Nebuchadnezzar and the beginning of restoration under Cyrus the Great of Persia  (2 Chronicles 10 to 36). The focus of this chapter is the reign of Jehoram, king of Judah.

Text
This chapter was originally written in the Hebrew language and is divided into 20 verses.

Textual witnesses
Some early manuscripts containing the text of this chapter in Hebrew are of the Masoretic Text tradition, which includes the Aleppo Codex (10th century), and Codex Leningradensis (1008).

There is also a translation into Koine Greek known as the Septuagint, made in the last few centuries BCE. Extant ancient manuscripts of the Septuagint version include Codex Vaticanus (B; B; 4th century), and Codex Alexandrinus (A; A; 5th century).

Old Testament references
: 
:

Jehoram, king of Judah (21:1–7)
This section contains the record of Jehoram's reign, but uniquely also has the records of the king's brothers (verses 2–4), which only occurs with David's family in Kings or Chronicles. As soon as Jehoram had established his power, he brutally murdered all his brothers, who were in charge of fortified cities, and several notables, most likely driven by his lust for control or fear of losing it. However, the divine wrath was restrained for the kingdom, because of the promise to David (1 Chronicles 17:1–15; cf. 2 Kings 8:17–19).

Verse 5
Jehoram was thirty-two years old when he became king, and he reigned eight years in Jerusalem.
 Cross references: 2 Kings 8:17; 2 Chronicles 21:20

"Eight years": based on Thiele-McFall calculation, Jehoram of Judah reigned from between April and September 848 BCE until his death between April and September 841 BCE. Unlike with his predecessors, Jehoram's reign is counted using the 'non-accession year method', which is commonly used only by the kings of the northern kingdom.

Edom and Libnah Rebel (21:8–11)
The text provides unclear description whether Jehoram managed to defeat the Edomites, only to state that Edom and Libnah successfully revolted against the kingdom of Judah (verse 10), which should give ample warning to Jehoram to repent from his sins, but instead he continued to establish idol worship in Judah.

Elijah’s Letter to Jehoram (21:12–15)
In Jehoram's regnal record, there was not a single prophet appearing in flesh and
blood, and the prophetic warning only came in a letter sent by Elijah, who was active in  the northern kingdom. Elijah's threats of divine punishment for Jehoram (verses 14–15) were all fulfilled and fell on Jehoram's people, family, property and own body (verses 16–19).

Death of Jehoram (21:16–20)
The punishment for Jehoram came from the south-western neighbors of the kingdom ("the Arabs who are near the Ethiopians"; cf. 2 Chronicles 14:9), and left with only the youngest son of Jehoram, the Davidic line was on the brink of total eradication. The Chronicler extensively describes Jehoram's final punishment in the form of a painful, incurable, yet indefinable sickness (probably a stomach ulcer leading to a chronic rectal prolapse).

Verse 20
He was thirty-two when he began to reign, and he reigned eight years in Jerusalem. And he departed with no one’s regret. They buried him in the City of David, but not in the tombs of the kings.
Cross references: 2 Kings 8:17; 2 Chronicles 21:5 
The repetition of Jehoram's age and length of reign (cf. verse 5) indicates a transcription from another source. 

See also

Related  Bible parts: 1 Kings 3, 1 Kings 22, 2 Kings 8, 2 Chronicles 16, 2 Chronicles 17

Notes

References

Sources

 
 Thiele, Edwin R., The Mysterious Numbers of the Hebrew Kings, (1st ed.; New York: Macmillan, 1951; 2d ed.; Grand Rapids: Eerdmans, 1965; 3rd ed.; Grand Rapids: Zondervan/Kregel, 1983).

External links
 Jewish translations:
 Divrei Hayamim II - II Chronicles - Chapter 21 (Judaica Press) in Hebrew and English translation [with Rashi's commentary] at Chabad.org
 Christian translations:
 Online Bible at GospelHall.org (ESV, KJV, Darby, American Standard Version, Bible in Basic English)
 2 Chronicles Chapter 21. Bible Gateway

21